Crataegus hupehensis is an Asian species of hawthorn that can grow to be a substantial tree. It is similar to C. pinnatifida var. major, but with less pronounced lobes on the leaves.

References

hupehensis